Davit "Dave Coskunian" Çoşkun was a Turkish-American soccer player of Armenian descent who earned three caps with the U.S. national team.  He played one season in the National Professional Soccer League and one in the North American Soccer League.

Professional career
In 1965, Coşkun began his professional career with İstanbulspor A.Ş. in Turkey.  On February 7, 1967, the nineteen-year-old Coskun signed with the Los Angeles Toros of the National Professional Soccer League.  The Toros folded at the end of the season, but Coskun remained in the Los Angeles area, playing for various amateur clubs.  On April 2, 1974, he joined the Los Angeles Aztecs of the North American Soccer League, but was released on May 1, 1974.  He then moved north to play that season with the San Jose Earthquakes.  In the fall of 1974, Coskun moved back to Los Angeles where he joined the Los Angeles Armenians of the Greater Los Angeles Soccer League.

National team
Coskunian played three games with the U.S. national team.  The first was a 4-0 loss to Bermuda on March 17, 1973.  He started, but came off for Mike Renshaw.  In his second game, a 4-0 loss to Poland on March 20, 1973, he replaced Rudy Getzinger at halftime.  Finally, in his last game, a 3-1 loss to Mexico on September 5, 1974, he replaced Bob Matteson in the 84th minute.

Name
Coşkun began his career in the United States using his birth name.  However, by the time he joined the Aztecs and Earthquakes in 1974, he was known as "Dave" Coskun.  He also used the name Dave Coskunian when playing for the national team.

References

External links
 Photo of Coskun with the Toros
 NASL stats

Sportspeople from Samsun
American soccer players
American people of Armenian descent
Ethnic Armenian sportspeople
İstanbulspor footballers
National Professional Soccer League (1967) players
Los Angeles Toros players
North American Soccer League (1968–1984) players
San Jose Earthquakes (1974–1988) players
Turkish footballers
Turkish emigrants to the United States
Turkish people of Armenian descent
United States men's international soccer players
Living people
Armenian footballers
Association football forwards
Year of birth missing (living people)